Shlomo Aronson (1936 – 21 February 2020) was an Israeli historian and professor of political science at Hebrew University of Jerusalem.

His 2004 book, Hitler, the Allies, and the Jews, argued a thesis that he had advanced in many of his earlier publications—to "explain the Holocaust in terms of a multiple trap". According to Aronson, the Nazis devised this trap such that Jews' attempts to extricate themselves would only further the Nazis' genocidal ambitions. The book received mixed reviews. The book received the awards "Israeli Political Science Association Award for outstanding book in English" and "Sybil Milton Prize of the German Studies Association for outstanding work on the Holocaust".

Aronson died on 21 February 2020 in Kfar Saba.

Works

References

1936 births
2020 deaths
Academic staff of the Hebrew University of Jerusalem
Israeli historians
Historians of the Holocaust
Burials at Yarkon Cemetery
Place of birth missing